Skrwa Prawa (Right Skrwa; in Polish also Skrwa, Skrwa Północna, or Płosznica) is a river of Poland, a right tributary of the Vistula.  Its own tributaries include the Okalewka, the Urszulewka, the Chraponianka, the Sierpienica, and the Bobrownica.

Its shorter counterpart the Skrwa Lewa (Left Skrwa) joins the Vistula about three miles upstream on the opposite bank.

Rivers of Poland
Rivers of Masovian Voivodeship